Cavitt Creek is a tributary of the Little River in Douglas County in the U.S. state of Oregon.

Managed by the Bureau of Land Management, the forested site features  Cavitt Creek waterfall above a swimming hole. Amenities include campsites, water spigots, parking, and restrooms, as well as proximity to fishing spots and hiking trails. The park is open from May 22 to September 26.

Bridge
Cavitt Creek Bridge carries Cavitt Creek Road over the Little River downstream of the confluence of the creek and the river. The road crosses Jim Creek, another Little River tributary, before reaching the bridge.

Tributaries
Named tributaries of Cavitt Creek from source to mouth are Withrow, Cultus, Liveoak, Tuttle, and Springer creeks. Further downstream come Mill, White Rock, Copperhead, Buck Peak, Buckshot, McKay, and Evans creeks.

See also
 List of rivers of Oregon

References

Rivers of Oregon
Rivers of Douglas County, Oregon